Articles on Tamil activism:
Tamil ethnic nationalist activism:
anti-Brahminism
 Self-respect movement
 Dravidar Kazhagam
Tamil linguistic activism
 Tanittamil Iyakkam
 Anti-Hindi agitations

Dravidian movement